Zaffer Abad Noon is a small village situated in Bhalwal Tehsil in the Punjab province of Pakistan. The former member of the National Assembly of Pakistan, Malik Karam Bakhsh Awan, is from the village.

References 

Populated places in Sargodha District